Kirkland may refer to:

Places

Canada
 Kirkland, Quebec, Canada
 Kirkland Island, British Columbia, Canada
 Kirkland Lake, Ontario, Canada

United Kingdom
 Kirkland, Allerdale, Cumbria, England, a hamlet
 Kirkland, Copeland, Cumbria, England, a village
 Kirkland, Eden, Cumbria, England, a village
 Kirkland, South Lakeland, a former parish now in Kendal
 Kirkland, Lancashire, England, a parish
 Kirkland, Dumfries and Galloway, Scotland, a location
 Kirkland railway station, a former station there 
 Kirkland, Fife, Scotland; a former village, absorbed by Methil

United States
 Kirkland, Arizona
 Kirkland, Georgia
 Kirkland, Illinois
 Kirkland, New York
 Kirkland, North Carolina
 Kirkland, Lincoln County, Tennessee
 Kirkland, Williamson County, Tennessee
 Kirkland, Texas
 Kirkland, Washington
 Kirkland Township, Adams County, Indiana

People 
Kirkland (surname)

Brands and enterprises
 Kirkland & Ellis, a law firm in the United States, based in Chicago, Illinois
 Kirkland Signature, the store brand of Costco
 Kirkland's, a retail chain in the United States that sells home decor

Education
 Kirkland High School and Community College, Methil, Scotland
 Kirkland College, a former college in New York, now merged with Hamilton College
 Kirkland House, one of the 12 undergraduate houses at Harvard University

Other
Kirkland (horse), 1905 Grand National winner

See also